The Takatika Grit is a geologic formation in Chatham Islands, New Zealand. It preserves fossils dating back to the Paleocene period, although it also preserves disturbed and re-worked Maastrichtian and Campanian microfossils and tetrapod fossils. A 2017 study found that it dated to late Early to Mid Paleocene on the basis of dinoflagellates. It has been subdivided into two informal units, a lower phosphatic unit containing bones and nodular phosphatic layers, and an upper unit with abundant sponge remains and siliceous microfossils.

Description 
The two informal units are further subdivided into two units each, the lower is divided into the lower  which consists of "poorly sorted, phosphatized grit with abundant phosphorite nodules and bones" and the upper  which consists of "nodular bedded sandstone and grit". The upper biosiliceous unit is divided into the lower , which is heavily bioturbated, and the upper  "characterized by parallel laminations and sinusoidal ripples".

Paleofauna

See also 
 Tupuangi Formation

References 

Paleontology in New Zealand
Chatham Islands
Paleocene Oceania
Geologic formations of New Zealand
Cenozoic paleontological sites